The 2022–23 James Madison Dukes women's basketball team represents James Madison University during the 2022–23 NCAA Division I women's basketball season. The Dukes, led by seventh-year head coach Sean O'Regan, played their home games at the Atlantic Union Bank Center as members of the Sun Belt Conference. This is their first season in the Sun Belt.

Previous season

Roster

Schedule and results

|-
!colspan=12 style=| Non-conference Regular Season
|-

|-
!colspan=12 style=| Conference Regular Season
|-

|-
!colspan=12 style=| Sun Belt Tournament

See also 
 2022–23 James Madison Dukes men's basketball team

References 

James Madison Dukes women's basketball seasons
James Madison
James Madison Dukes women's basketball
James Madison Dukes women's basketball
James Madison